The 1998 Formula Nippon Championship was scheduled over 10 rounds and  contested over 9 rounds. 14 different teams, 29 different drivers, 3 different chassis and only 1 engine competed. Each round saw a Special Stage after the original qualifying. The best six qualifiers had to compete in a separate session for the pole.

Teams and drivers

Masao Yamada passed away from a subarachnoid hemorrhage on 12 July, 1998.

Calendar

Race 7 no special stage held due to bad weather conditions

(ss) indicate the winner of the special stage, who started from pole - (fq) indicate the original fastest qualifier. In all other races, the fastest qualifier was also the winner of the special stage.

Championship standings

Drivers' Championship
Scoring system

Teams' Championship

References

External links
1998 Japanese Championship Formula Nippon

Formula 3000
Super Formula
Nippon